Cross Cafe, formerly known as Hitlers' Cross or Hitler's Cross, was an Adolf Hitler-themed restaurant at Kharghar in Navi Mumbai, a satellite city of Mumbai. The restaurant's former name, "Hitlers' Cross", referred to the swastika and the Cross of Honour of the German Mother, symbols of the Nazi regime, and the restaurant's interior was decorated in red, white and black - the colours of the Nazi party. An enormous portrait of Hitler was the first thing visitors saw when they opened the door. The manager of Hitlers' Cross told the Times of India: "We wanted to be different. This is one name that will stay in people's minds ... we want to tell people we are different in the way he was different." After severe criticism, Hitlers' Cross had to drop its name and is today called the Cross Cafe. Cross Cafe now has a branch in Nerul.

Controversy
The swastika is controversial in some parts of the world due to usage by the Third Reich.

The Hitler-themed restaurant caused an uproar in the Jewish community in Mumbai and other citizens in the city. Although the store's owner, Punit Sablok, argued that his establishment was not promoting Hitler, Jonathan Solomon, chairman of the Indian Jewish Federation, was among the infuriated. According to Solomon, the new establishment "[signified] a severe lack of awareness of the agony of millions of Jews caused by one man," and he promised to work hard "to stop this deification of Hitler." According to the Associated Press, there are just 5,500 Jews in India, and all but 1,000 live in Mumbai. Sablok's refusal to change the theme earned the restaurant notoriety around the world as strongly worded letters from Israel and Germany outpoured in the city's dailies. The Israeli Embassy also sent a strongly worded letter to the owners.

Finally, on 24 August 2006, after less than a week of international outcry and a meeting with local Jewish leaders, Punit Sablok agreed to remove Hitler's name and the Nazi swastika from billboards and the restaurant's menu. "I chose the name innocently. I didn't expect that it would snowball into a major controversy", Sablok said. At that point, he said he was unsure of the name to be chosen, but sure of one thing: "no more dictators". The Indian Jewish Federation reacted positively, saying it was relieved. "The incident exposes the lack of understanding of the present generation about the atrocities of the past and the need to educate them about crimes against humanity," Solomon said.

On 30 August, the restaurant was renamed the Cross Cafe. "We hope this name will be a trouble free one. We have deleted Hitler's name from it and would also be replacing the swastika with multi-colored rings," Punit Sablok said. Two other options, Fort Knox and Exotic Goblet, were considered by the owners before they decided on the new name, Sabhlok added. Puneet Sablok said the Nazi swastika that adorned signs advertising the eatery and its menus would be removed.

Other similar establishments
Adolf Hitler Techno Bar & Cocktail Show used to exist in Busan, South Korea, though by 2003 it had been renamed to the Ddolf Ditler Techno Bar & Cocktail Show, and then renamed again after Julius Caesar. By 2011 the bar was replaced by Carnival Song Club karaoke bar. In Bandung, Indonesia, there is a Nazi-themed cafe named "Soldatenkaffee"; however, the cafe claimed to be a World War II theme instead of a Nazi theme.

External links

References

2006 establishments in Maharashtra
Swastika
Navi Mumbai
Restaurants in India
Theme restaurants
Economy of Navi Mumbai
Cultural depictions of Adolf Hitler